Kandake, kadake or kentake (Meroitic: 𐦲𐦷𐦲𐦡 kdke), often Latinised as Candace (Kandakē), was the Meroitic term for the sister of the king of Kush who, due to the matrilineal succession, would bear the next heir, making her a queen mother. She had her own court, probably acted as a landholder and held a prominent secular role as regent. Contemporary Greek and Roman sources treated it, incorrectly, as a name. The name Candace is derived from the way the word is used in the New Testament.

Archaeological sources
The Kandakes of Meroe were first described through the Greek geographer's Strabo account of the "one-eyed Candace" in 23 BCE in his encyclopedia Geographica.  There are at least ten regnant Meroitic queens during the 500 years between 260 BCE and 320 CE, and at least six during the 140 periods between 60 BC and 80 AD. The iconographic portrayal of the Meroitic queens depicts them as women often alone and at the forefront of their stelae and sculptures and shown in regal women's clothing. Early depictions of Kushite queens typically do not have Egyptian elements making their appearance drastically different from their Kushite men and Egyptian counterparts. As seen in the Dream Stela of Tanawetamani, a large shawl was wrapped around the body with an additionally decorated cloak worn over the first; typically, a small tab-like element hanging below the hem touches the ground and has been interpreted as a little tail. The first association with this element of dress is with Tarharqo's mother during his coronation ceremony.  

It was not until George Reisner excavated the royal cemeteries at El Kurru and Nuri that archaeological material became available to study the Kushite queenship. Additionally, a few royal tombs of Kushite women have been found at Meroe's cemetery and in Egypt at Abydos (Leahy 1994). At El Kurru, six pyramids belong to royal women of the XXV Dynasty and an pyramid for queen Qalhata of the Napatan period. At Nuri, the tombs of royal women are located on the west plateau with more inscriptional information available at the site, linking the roles that the kings' mothers played in succession and their importance during the Kushite dynasty.

The most important event that Kushite women participated in was kingship's ensured continuity, where royal women were mentioned and represented in the royal ceremony. The lunettes of the stelae of Tanawetamani, Harsiyotef, and Nastasen all provide iconographic and textual evidence of these kings' enthronement. In all of these stelae, the king is accompanied by a female member of his family, mother, and wife. The king's mother played an essential role in the legitimacy of her son as the king; textual evidence from Taharqo's coronation stelae represents inscriptional evidence suggesting that the king's mother traveled to her son's coronation. During the Kushite XXV Dynasty, the office that is known as God's Wife of Amun was established. The royal women in this role acted as the primary contact with the Kushite god Amun. They played a decisive role in the king's accession to the throne.

Bas-reliefs dated to about 170 B.C. reveal the kentake Shanakdakheto, dressed in armor and wielding a spear in battle. She did not rule as queen regent or queen mother, but as a fully independent ruler. Her husband was her consort. In bas-reliefs found in the ruins of building projects she commissioned, Shanakdakheto is portrayed both alone as well as with her husband and son, who would inherit the throne by her death.

Ethiopian sources
Evidence outside of Nubia that shows additional links to Kushite's queenship concept are found in Ethiopia. Ethiopia has a long dynastic history claimed to be over three millennia from before 1000 BC to 1973, the year of the overthrow of the last Menelik emperor, Haile Selassie. The Ethiopian monarchy's official chronicle of dynastic succession descends from Menelik I includes six regnant queens referred to as Kandake. The following queens from the king list have "Kandake" added to their name:
 Nicauta Kandake (r. 740–730 BCE)
 Nikawla Kandake II (r. 342–332 BCE)
 Akawsis Kandake III (r. 325–315 BCE)
 Nikosis Kandake IV (r. 242–232 BCE)
 Nicotnis Kandake V (r. 35–25 BCE)
 Garsemot Kandake VI (r. 40–50 CE) – Allegedly the queen who ruled at the time of the Biblical story of the Ethiopian eunuch.

Twenty-one queens are recorded as sole regent in the kingdom of Ethiopia until the 9th century CE. The conquest of Meroe by the Axumite King Ezana may well provide the historical fiction for the Ethiopian dynastic claim to the Nubian Kandakes and their kings, as it was from this point onwards that the Axumites began calling themselves "Ethiopians", a Greco-Roman term previously used largely for the ancient Nubians. For example, Makeda, Queen of Sheba, in the Kebra Nagast, is also recognized as Candace or "Queen Mother".

Greco-Roman sources
Pliny writes that the "Queen of the Ethiopians" bore the title Candace, and indicates that the Ethiopians had conquered ancient Syria and the Mediterranean.

In 25 BC the Kush kandake Amanirenas, as reported by Strabo, attacked the city of Syene, today's Aswan, in territory of the Roman Empire; Emperor Augustus destroyed the city of Napata in retaliation.

Cassius Dio wrote that Kandake's army advanced as far as the Elephantine in Egypt, but Petronius defeated them and took Napata, their capital, and other cities.

Four African queens were known to the Greco-Roman world as the "Candaces": Amanishakheto, Amanirenas, Nawidemak, and Malegereabar.

Biblical usage

In the New Testament, a treasury official of "Candace, queen of the Ethiopians", returning from a trip to Jerusalem, met with Philip the Evangelist:

Now an angel of the Lord said to Philip, "Rise and go toward the south to the road that goes down from Jerusalem to Gaza." This is a desert place.  And he rose and went. And there was an Ethiopian, a eunuch, a court official of Candace, queen of the Ethiopians, who was in charge of all her treasure. He had come to Jerusalem to worship

He discussed with Philip the meaning of a perplexing passage from the Book of Isaiah. Philip explained the scripture to him and he was promptly baptised in some nearby water. The eunuch 'went on his way, rejoicing', and presumably therefore reported back on his conversion to the Kandake.

Alexandrian legend

A legend in the Alexander romance claims that "Candace of Meroë" fought Alexander the Great. In fact, Alexander never attacked Nubia and never attempted to move further south than the oasis of Siwa in Egypt. The story is that when Alexander attempted to conquer her lands in 332 BC, she arranged her armies strategically to meet him and was present on a war elephant when he approached. Having assessed the strength of her armies, Alexander decided to withdraw from Nubia, heading to Egypt instead. Another story claims that Alexander and Candace had a romantic encounter.

These accounts originate from Alexander Romance by an unknown writer called Pseudo-Callisthenes, and the work is largely a fictionalized and grandiose account of Alexander's life. It is commonly quoted, but there seems to be no historical reference to this event from Alexander's time.  The whole story of Alexander and Candace's encounter appears to be legendary.

John Malalas has mixed the Pseudo-Callisthenes material with other and wrote about the affair of Alexander with Kandake, adding that they got married. Malalas also wrote that Kandake was an Indian queen and Alexander met her during his Indian campaign.

List of kandakes

The following queens are listed by László Török:

Shanakdakhete (177 BC–155 BC) (earliest known ruling queen)
Amanirenas (40 BC–10 BC)
Amanishakheto (c. 10 BC–1 AD)
Nawidemak (either early in the 1st century BC or 1st century AD)
Amanitore (1–20 AD)
Amanikhatashan (62–85 AD)
 (early 4th century)
Amanipilade (mid-4th century)

Based on the reading of a single inscription, some lists give two later kandakes named Maloqorebar (266–283 AD) and Lahideamani (306-314 AD). A recently discovered inscription corrects this earlier reading, however, showing that neither was a woman.

References

Sources

History of Africa
Women in the New Testament
Women rulers in Africa